Kelly Williamson (née Handel, born December 5, 1977) is an American triathlete who races in non-drafting, long-course events. In 2012, she took 2nd place at the Ironman 70.3 World Championship.

Athletic career
Williamson was raised in Zionsville, Indiana before moving to Illinois to attend college at the University of Illinois at Urbana–Champaign. She attended on a swimming scholarship and served as the swim team captain for two years while studying kinesiology. As a swimmer she focused on the 1650 and 500 free, the 200 fly, and the 400 IM. 

In 2002, following college, Williamson was invited to the United States Olympic Training Center (OTC) in Colorado Springs by USA Triathlon after being identified as potential elite young talent at Olympic distance triathlon racing. She had experienced some early success in triathlon after college swimming, where she used triathlon as a new way to stay active and satisfy her enjoyment of athletic training. At the OTC she trained for two years while competing on the International Triathlon Union (ITU) racing circuit. During this time she won the 2002 Pan American ITU Regional Championships and was named the 2002 Elite Rookie Triathlete of the Year.

In 2005, Williamson began coaching after suffering an injury in a bike crash that kept her out of competition for most of 2005. This down time allowed her to evaluate her triathlon career and to pursue non-drafting triathlon racing after she found that she wasn't enjoying the ITU racing style despite her initial success in 2002. Williamson moved to Austin, Texas with her husband and began racing Ironman and half-Ironman distances, and saw her results steadily improve each year. In 2012, Williamson by her own admission was having the best season of her professional career and had a 2nd-place finish at the 2012 Ironman 70.3 World Championship where she had the fastest run time of the day. However, she finished a "disappointing" 15th place a month later at the 2012 Ironman World Championship, her third appearance at the championship event. In May 2014, Williamson won her first Ironman distance race at Ironman Texas, posting the only sub-3 hour marathon by a female in the race.

Notable results
Williamson's notable achievements include:

References

External links

ITU Results - Handel
ITU Results - Williamson

1977 births
Living people
Illinois Fighting Illini women's swimmers
American female triathletes
People from Zionsville, Indiana
Sportspeople from Indiana